Al Rabin (January 26, 1936 – August 14, 2012) was a producer of soap operas, specifically known for his work on Days of Our Lives. Rabin served in multiple capacities in his sixteen years at Days, first as a director and then as a supervising executive producer to Mrs. Ted Corday, and from 1985 to 1992 as a co-executive producer.

Rabin retired from television work in the mid-1990s. His contributions earned him and the show eight Daytime Emmy Award nominations for outstanding direction and outstanding drama series.

Rabin died in August, 2012. He was memorialized at the end of the August 24, 2012 episode of Days of Our Lives.

Executive Producing Tenure

References

External links

Al Rabin Tribute

1936 births
2012 deaths
Soap opera producers